Christopher Mior (born February 15, 1987 in Toronto) is a Canadian-born Italian ice dancer. Early in his career, Mior competed for Canada with Patricia Stuckey and Krista Wolfenden. In 2009, he began competing for Italy with Federica Testa. They are the 2011 Italian national champions. He currently skates with Federica Bernardi.

Competitive highlights

With Bernardi for Italy

With Testa for Italy

With Stuckey for Canada

With Wolfenden for Canada

References

External links 

 
 

1987 births
Living people
People from Toronto
Canadian male ice dancers
Italian male ice dancers
Competitors at the 2013 Winter Universiade